The 2021 Sri Lanka Super League was the first season of Sri Lanka Super League, after a significant 3 Year delay resulting in Sri Lanka Football having a dry period of a lack of top division football. Today it was meant to be the top division of Sri Lankan football. The season after numerous political delays and lack of preparation finally kicked off in the middle of the pandemic on 19 April 2021. The Super League was the brainchild of the current President Jaswar Umar.

Summary

Impact of COVID-19 pandemic
The start of the season was impacted by the ongoing COVID-19 situation. After the 2018–19 season, the inaugural Super League was scheduled to kick-off in April 2020, but was rescheduled to November 2020, 29 January 2021 and finally started on 19 April 2021, due to concerns of the pandemic with discussions held with the health authorities.

Due pandemic, this season was forced to play on a single round-robin system (each club plays the others once).

After the International Break at the end of matchday 3, the tournament recommencement was scheduled to 2 July 2021. But the Football Sri Lanka announced the postponement on 16 June 2021, due to travel restrictions.

Pre-season tournament
After numerous delays, and conflict on basing the National Team Priorities of Technical Head Amir Alagic, clubs were asked if they could play a Premier Season Practice Tournament. Causing further delays to the actual tournament.
A pre season was launched with much glamour and delight but unfortunately with Covid 19 being a constant outbreak, the tournament delayed further. Since the Sri Lanka national football team were set to play their 2022 FIFA World Cup qualifying second round games against Lebanon and South Korea in March, Football Sri Lanka without any professional consultation conducted Sri Lanka Super League pre-season tournament, without spectators or a plan.

Super League pre-season tournament was conducted with the 10 Super League clubs, divided to two groups, group stage matches held from 17 February 2021 to 24 March 2021.

Teams
The league is made up of 10 clubs that were selected from the Sri Lanka Champions League at the end of the 2018–19 season, after meeting the Football Federation of Sri Lanka's Club Licensing Criteria in association with the Asian Football Confederation.

Teams and their divisions
''Note: Table lists clubs in alphabetical order.

Foreign players

League table

Results

Fixture

Round 1

Round 2

Round 3

Round 4

Round 5

Round 6

Round 7

Round 8

Round 9

Top Scorer

Own Goals

Clean Sheet

Champions

References 

Sri Lanka Super League seasons
1
Sri Lanka
Sri Lanka